In set theory, the random algebra or random real algebra is the Boolean algebra of Borel sets of the unit interval modulo the ideal of measure zero sets. It is used in random forcing to add random reals to a model of set theory. The random algebra was studied by John von Neumann in 1935 (in work later published as ) who showed that it is not isomorphic to the Cantor algebra of Borel sets modulo meager sets.

See also
Random number

References

 

Boolean algebra
Forcing (mathematics)